Sand Storm ( Sufat Chol) is a 2016 Arabic-language Israeli coming-of-age film directed by Elite Zexer. It was shown in the Panorama section at the 66th Berlin International Film Festival. At the 2016 Sundance Film Festival it won the Grand Jury Prize in the World Cinema Dramatic section. It won the Best Film Award at the Ophir Awards. It was selected as the Israeli entry for the Best Foreign Language Film at the 89th Academy Awards but it was not nominated.

The film is set in a Bedouin village in southern Israel and is Elite Zexer's directorial debut.

Cast
 Lamis Ammar as Layla
 Ruba Blal as Jalila
 Hitham Omari as Suliman
 Khadija Al Akel as Tasnim
 Jalal Masrwa as Anwar

See also
 List of submissions to the 89th Academy Awards for Best Foreign Language Film
 List of Israeli submissions for the Academy Award for Best Foreign Language Film

References

External links
 

2010s coming-of-age drama films
2010s feminist films
2016 directorial debut films
2016 drama films
2016 films
2010s Arabic-language films
Bedouins in Israel
Films about families
Films about polygamy
Films set in Israel
Israeli coming-of-age drama films
Ophir Award Winners